Ndèye Fatou Seck Soumah Sow (born 6 April 1986 in Saint-Louis, Senegal) is a Senegalese woman sprinter. At the 2012 Summer Olympics, she competed in the Women's 200 metres but was eliminated in the first round.

References

1986 births
Living people
Senegalese female sprinters
Olympic athletes of Senegal
Athletes (track and field) at the 2012 Summer Olympics
World Athletics Championships athletes for Senegal
Sportspeople from Saint-Louis, Senegal